William Mellor (born 3 April 1976) is an English actor, singer and model. He is known for his roles as Jambo Bolton in Hollyoaks, Gaz Wilkinson in Two Pints of Lager and a Packet of Crisps,  Warren Stamp in EastEnders, DC Spike Tanner in No Offence, Steve Connolly in Broadchurch, Georgie in Barking! and Ollie Curry in White Van Man. In 2021, he began appearing in the ITV soap opera Coronation Street as Harvey Gaskell.

Career
Mellor first came to the public's attention in 1990, when he played Ben Rowlingson in the children's programme Children's Ward. In 1995, he joined the cast of the soap opera Hollyoaks and played James "Jambo" Bolton until 1998. He had a cameo as Jambo in a Christmas edition of Hollyoaks. He released a cover of Leo Sayer's "When I Need You", which reached number 5 in the UK Singles Chart, as well as a follow-up single called "No Matter What I Do", which reached number 23. He also made an appearance in the music video for Boyzone's Comic Relief single "When The Going Gets Tough".

Shortly after, Mellor appeared as Greg in Is Harry on the Boat?. He played Jack Vincent in Casualty from 2001 to 2003, and starred as Gaz Wilkinson in the comedy Two Pints of Lager and a Packet of Crisps from 2001 to 2011. Mellor starred as "Barmpot" in the postal worker drama Sorted, and played DC Jed Griffiths in the second series of Murder Investigation Team. In 2004, Mellor provided the voice for Georgie the dog in the CITV series Barking!. He played Tom in the second series of The Street. Mellor won the first series of the BBC singing contest Comic Relief does Fame Academy in 2003. He made his EastEnders debut on 20 May 2007 playing womanising salesman Warren Stamp.

Mellor was a guest star in the BBC fantasy drama Merlin, playing the villain Valiant in the series second episode of the same name. In October 2008, he starred in The Prisoner, a documentary about prison life. Mellor portrayed Chris in the British horror thriller film The Reeds. Mellor did a brief stint on children's television channel CBeebies, in which he read books for the audience. In 2011, he starred in the BBC Three comedy White Van Man and the BBC One drama Waterloo Road.

From 2011 to 2012, he played Liam Flynn in the BBC One comedy series In with the Flynns, as well as appearing in White Van Man. Mellor had a guest role in the final episode of the BBC Three comedy series Mongrels. In 2013, he played Steve Connolly in the ITV detective drama Broadchurch. In 2014, he appeared on BBC One's Kay Mellor drama series In The Club. In February 2021, it was announced that Mellor would join the cast of Coronation Street as Harvey Gaskell, with his first scenes airing in March. From 24 September 2022, Mellor competed in the twentieth series of Strictly Come Dancing, partnered with professional dancer Nancy Xu. The couple made it to the semi-finals, but were eliminated on 12 December 2022, finishing in fifth place.

Personal life
Mellor met dancer Michelle McSween when they starred together in the stage musical Oh, What a Night in 1999. They married in 2007, and have two children. Mellor is an avid supporter of Manchester United.

In 2020, in a podcast with fellow actor and friend Ralf Little, Mellor discussed his struggle with depression after the death of his sister six years before. Mellor's father, Bill, died in 2020, two weeks after being diagnosed with cancer. In week 8 of Strictly Come Dancing,  on 12 November 2022, Mellor danced a waltz to the song "Three Times a Lady", as a tribute to his father.

Filmography

Guest appearances
All Star Family Fortunes (2011) – Contestant
All Star Mr & Mrs (5 June 2013) – Contestant
Big Star's Little Star (4 September 2013) – Contestant
I Love My Country (28 September 2013) – Guest
Through the Keyhole (2014, 2017) – Homeowner/panellist
Celebrity Juice (2016, 2018, 2019, 2020, 2021) – Guest
A Question of Sport (2022) – Contestant

Awards and nominations

References

External links

 

1976 births
Living people
English male soap opera actors
Singing talent show winners
Actors from Stockport